Dickie is a surname, a nickname (most often as a diminutive form of Richard) and a given name. It may refer to:

People

Surname 

 Rev. A. M. Dickie (1903–1978), Australian peace activist
 George Dickie (philosopher) (born 1926), American art critic
 George Dickie (botanist) (1812–1882), Scottish botanist
 Harold Dickie (1874–1954), New Zealand politician
 John Dickie (disambiguation)
 Kate Dickie (born circa 1971), Scottish actress
 Mat Dickie (born 1981), English indie video game developer
 Matthew Dickie (1873–1959), Scottish professional football player
 Murray Dickie (1924–1995), Scottish tenor opera singer and director
 Neville Dickie (born 1937), English boogie-woogie and stride piano player
 Simon Dickie (born 1951), former New Zealand rowing cox

Nickname 

 Richard Annand (1914–2004), English recipient of the Victoria Cross
 Dickie Baugh (1864–1929), English footballer
 Dickie Bird (born 1933), English cricket umpire
 Dickie Boon (1878–1961), Canadian ice hockey player
 Dickie Brooks (born 1943), English cricketer
 Dickie Burrough (1909–1994), English cricketer
 Richard John Cork (1917–1944), Second World War fighter ace
 Dickie Dale (1927–1961), former Grand Prix motorcycle road racer
 Dickie Dale (footballer) (circa 1896–1970), English footballer
 Dickie Davies (1928–2023), British television presenter
 Richard Dawson (born 1932), British-American actor, comedian, game show host
 Dickie Downs (1886–1949), English footballer
 Dickie Foss (born 1912), English football player and coach
 Dickie Fuller (1913–1987), West Indian cricketer
 Dickie Goodman (1934–1989), American comedian
 Dickie Guy (born 1949), English football goalkeeper
 Richard Haine (1916–2008), English Second World War RAF pilot
 Dickie Hemric (1933–2017), American basketball player
 Dickie Henderson (1922–1985), British actor
 Dickie Little, American musician (The Ziggens)
 Dickie Lloyd (1891–1950), Irish cricketer
 Dickie Moore (actor) (born 1925), former American child actor
 Dickie Moore (ice hockey) (born 1931), Canadian ice hockey player
 Dickie Peterson (born 1948), American singer
 Dickie Post (born 1945), American football player
 Dickie Rock (born 1940), Irish rock singer
 Dickie Stobbart (1891–1952), Canadian soccer player
 Dickie Thon (born 1958), American baseball player
 Richard Gordon Wakeford (1922–2007), British Royal Air Force air marshal
 Dickie Watmough (1912–1962), English footballer and cricketer

Given name 

 Dickie Harris (born 1950), Canadian footballer
 Dickie Noles (born 1956), pitcher in Major League Baseball

Fictional characters 

 Boerke, a comic strip character known as Dickie in some languages
 Dickie Dare, a comic strip character
 Dickie Flemming, in the soap opera Coronation Street
 Billericay Dickie, in the song of the same name
 Dickie Duck, a Disney character in the Donald Duck universe
 Dickie Greenleaf, in the film The Talented Mr. Ripley

See also 

 Dickie (disambiguation)
 Dicky (name)
 Dickey (name)

Lists of people by nickname